Proclus or Proculeius, son of the physician Themison, was a hierophant at Laodiceia in Syria. He wrote, according to the Suda, the following works:

On the gods (θεολογία)
On the myth of Pandora in Hesiod (εἰς τὴν παρ' Ἡσιόδῳ τῆς Πανδώρας μῦθον)
On golden words (εἰς τὰ χρυσᾶ ἔπη)
On Nicomachus' introduction to number theory (εἰς τὴν Νικομάχου εἰσαγωγὴν τῆς ἀριθμητικῆς)
some geometrical treatises

He is also mentioned by Damascius in a commentary on Plato.

Although a commentary on the Pythagorean Golden Verses, known through a translation into Arabic (in the El Escorial library as manuscript 888) has sometimes been attributed to this Proclus (following a theory promoted by ), this is disputed, and a more widely accepted theory is that the commentary is instead by Proclus Diadochus.

References

Year of birth missing
Year of death missing
Ancient Greek mathematicians
Ancient Greek writers
People from Latakia
Philosophers of mathematics